Crataegus mercerensis is a hawthorn that is considered to be a synonym of either C. chrysocarpa or of C. dodgei.

References

mercerensis
Flora of North America